Cuba Libre is a studio album by Lasse Stefanz, released in 2011. Already before the album was released, the band had sold platinum for the 14th time.

Track listing
Cuba Libre
Dagen går mot kväll
På vår camping
Äppelblom, hägg och syren
Driving My Life Away
Ett regn av tårar
Comment ça va
Tiden läker inga sår
När tunga moln har landat
Sweet Senorita
Vi ses snart igen
Dom kallar mej playboy
Brev till en vän
Send Me Some Lovin'
Rap Das Armas - Parapapa
I Surrender ("En blick och nånting händer"), bonus)

Charts

Certifications

References 

2011 albums
Lasse Stefanz albums